Mohamed Ibrahim  (born 3 March 1990) is an Egyptian professional snooker player. He returned to the professional tour after a three year absence after he won the 2022 African Snooker Championship.



Career
As the winner of the 2018 ABSF African Snooker Championships he was awarded a place on the professional snooker tour for the 2018–19 season on a two-year card.

He previously competed at the highest level at the 2012 Six-red World Championship where he pushed eventual tournament winner Mark Davis to a deciding frame.

In October 2018 Ibrahim withdrew his tour card, having not entered a single match during the season.

He won the 2022 African Snooker Championship in Casablanca, Morocco in July 2022. He secured his first win back on tour defeating Julien Leclercq in UK Championship qualifying in November 2022. He has also become the first Egyptian player to make a professional century, and won a second match to qualify for the Welsh Open.

Performance and rankings timeline

Career finals

Amateur finals: 2 (2 titles)

References

1990 births
Living people
Egyptian snooker players